Captain John Treasure Jones  (15 August 1905 – 12 May 1993) was a British naval officer who became a well-known media figure in the mid-1960s following his appointment as the last master of the Cunard liner, . He has been described as one of the 20th century's most distinguished mariners, in war and in peacetime. His forebears were men of the sea, who had captained sailing ships, and he elected to follow in their tradition.

Family background
John Treasure Jones was born on 18 August 1905, at Cuckoo Mill Farm at Pelcomb Cross, outside Haverfordwest, Pembrokeshire. His father, Shrewsbury Treasure Jones, was a hay & corn merchant and ran the small 45 acre farm as a side line.

In 1917 he gained a scholarship to Haverfordwest Grammar School, but did not complete his formal education as the possibility of employment on a ship came along, just a week before taking his final examinations.

Early years at sea

In 1921, not yet 16, Jones signed on for a four-year apprenticeship with J. C. Gould Steamship Co. Ltd. of Cardiff. He first joined SS Grelgrant, a 4,785-ton tramp ship, and later transferred to SS Grelhead. Outward-bound they delivered coal from the South Wales coalfields to bunkering stations around the world and returned with cargoes of grain.

Having completed his apprenticeship as a bosun, he regularly attended nautical school in Cardiff in order to progress through the grades of his nautical qualifications. Jones joined the Royal Naval Reserve (RNR) as a probationary midshipman in 1923.

Jones then joined Hall Bros of Newcastle in 1926, serving at first, as third mate, on the tramp ship SS Ambassador and then, as second mate, on SS Caduceus.

In August 1929, at 24, he was promoted to lieutenant RNR.

In August 1929 he joined the White Star Line on his first liner, SS Euripides, taking emigrants out to Australia and then on SS Delphic. The Great Depression set in and shipping fell on bad days. In November 1930 the company sent him to do twelve months reserve training in the Royal Navy, after which he was laid off.

In 1930–31 Jones served six months afloat in the aircraft carrier  and four months in the destroyer  on the Mediterranean station.

In November 1932 Jones managed to obtain employment as an assistant superintendent stevedore with Rea's Ltd, working with the Leyland Line ships at the Canada and Huskisson Docks in Liverpool. The Leyland Line was sold to T. & J. Harrison Ltd. and Jones soon left the company.

In July 1934 he returned to sea with the Blue Funnel Line, in SS Machaon and then SS Rhexenor.

In 1937 he joined the Cunard White Star Line as a junior third officer on his second liner, the 16,243-ton liner  serving under Captain Bisset, who in 1912 had been aboard  when she rescued the  survivors. By the time the war had started he was senior third officer in the 26,943-ton MV Britannic.

In August 1937 he was promoted to lieutenant commander RNR.

War service

From September 1939 he served as the Navigating Officer on the armed merchant cruiser Laurentic (formerly  of the Cunard White Star Line). Initially their task was to patrol the waters between Iceland and the Faroe Islands to prevent German supply shipping getting in and out of the North Sea. Later they were re-deployed into the Denmark Strait between Greenland and Iceland. On 4 November 1940, when returning to Liverpool from a patrol between Portugal and the Azores, Laurentic was torpedoed and sunk, 300 miles west of the Bloody Foreland in Ireland, with the loss of 49 lives. The 367 survivors were adrift for about six hours.

The following month he was appointed to the command of HMS Sunflower, a new  that was being completed at Smith's Yard in Middlesbrough. Ninety percent of the crew had not been to sea before, but were strengthened and knit together by a small number of trained ratings and naval pensioners. Once trained, they joined B1 Group in Derry which was employed escorting Atlantic convoys. HMS Sunflower picked up 27 survivors in -high waves, for which Jones was Mentioned in Dispatches, and took over command of the convoy escort.

In June 1945 Jones was promoted Acting-Captain RNR and posted to South East Asia Command under Admiral Mountbatten. He was appointed as divisional sea transport officer of the Netherlands East Indies, based in Java, Batavia. The war in Asia had ended in August 1945 with the Japanese capitulation but they were still required to deal with the return transport of troops and supplies, as well as the shipping of the civilian and military prisoners of war out of the Japanese camps.

Jones was demobbed in March 1947 but remained in the Naval Reserve.

He was promoted to captain RNR on 31 December 1949 and retired from the service in 1960.

Post-war service

In February 1954 he was appointed staff captain RMS Caronia, until he was given his first command of cargo/passenger liner RMS Media in May 1957, followed by the 22,017-ton liner , then the 22,592-ton  in 1959 to the early 1960s.

From December 1962 he commanded . Whilst his previous commands had been solely on the North Atlantic, Mauretania was used for cruises. Even so, she was facing competition from much more modern ships and was beginning to lose money for Cunard Line.

In 1964 Texaco completed a new oil refinery in Milford Haven, Pembrokeshire, just 10 miles from where John Treasure Jones was born. Texaco chartered Mauretania to take the guests from Southampton to Milford Haven and back. The opening ceremony was performed by Queen Elizabeth the Queen Mother, who travelled down on the royal train. Afterwards, the captain hosted lunch on board for the Queen Mother and the other guests.
In the autumn of 1965 it was announced that Mauretania would be withdrawn from service and sold to Ward's ship breaking yard in Inverkeithing, Fife in Scotland. On the night of 22/23 November he navigated the mud straits of the River Forth without tugs, and made the final berthing through the shallows above the mud banks on the midnight high tide.

He briefly commanded  and then  from September 1965. 
In August 1966, under his command, she made the fastest eastbound passage since August 1938 in 4 days, 10 hours and 6 minutes, averaging . 

On 27 September 1967, Queen Mary arrived back in Southampton having completed her 1,000th and last crossing of the North Atlantic, having carried 2,112,000 passengers over 3,792,227 miles (6,102,998 km).
On 31 October she sailed from Southampton for the last time with 1,093 passengers and 806 crew. For the first time in his long career, this was Treasure Jones's only voyage around Cape Horn. She arrived in Long Beach, California on 9 December 1967 and the captain lowered both the Cunard house flag and his own Blue Ensign when he conducted the sale to the City of Long Beach on 11 December 1967.

Treasure Jones retired in August 1968, aged 63, after a career of 47 years, of which he served almost 43½ continuous years at sea. He died of an aneurysm on 12 May 1993, just three months short of his 88th birthday, at Chandler's Ford, near Southampton.

Family and personal life
At school he had been in the first elevens for football and cricket. He was also a very competent boxer, which stood him in good stead during his apprenticeship years.

In August 1933 Jones married Eulalie Isobelle (Belle) Lees in Haverfordwest and they had three sons and a daughter

After retiring from the sea he regularly played cricket for the Master Mariners up until the age of 83. In later years he also took up golf and regularly took his clubs along with him on board ship. Once he retired he continued playing regularly as a member of Stoneham Golf Club, Southampton, right up until he died.

Recognition

His decorations and medals were:
1939–45 Star
Atlantic Star
Africa Star with Bar for North Africa 1942–43
1939–45 War Medal with oak leaf for Mention in Dispatches (twice)
Coronation Medal
Reserve Decoration with Bar.

In 1968 the University of Wales conferred on him an Honorary Doctorate in Law.

In 1978 was granted the Freedom of Haverfordwest, his home town.

On the final voyage of Queen Mary in 1967 he was awarded:
 Honorary Member of the Panama Canal Pilots Association
 Honorary Pilot of the Port of Long Beach
 First Honorary Port Ambassador of the Port of Long Beach

Commands

 Sources: Directorate of Personnel Support (Navy), Archive Services and Summary of 'Continuous Certificate of Discharge' Books for Jones, R21261

Footnotes

References

Bibliography

 An account of the Last Great Voyage by a passenger.

BBC TV Archives 
BBC WALES: MASTER AT SEA - 50 minute documentary filmed as sea aboard Mauretania. Date: June 1964.
BBC WALES NEWS ARCHIVE CUT STORIES. Programme number: PEN9130K. Date: 10/11/1965. Catalogue number: 10476050.
QUEEN MARY ARRIVES SOUTHAMPTON. Programme number: ANB6082R. Date: 11/04/1967. Catalogue number: 472694.
BBC WALES NEWS ITEMS. Programme number: PEN9154T. Date: 10/05/1967. Catalogue number: 10542213.
QUEEN MARY LINER LEAVES NEW YORK FOR SOUTHAMPTON. Programme number: ANB6246F. Date: 22/09/1967. Catalogue number: 473791.
QUEEN MARY LINER FINAL VOYAGE. Programme number: ANB6246F. Date: 22/09/1967. Catalogue number: 473784.
STORY OF THE QUEEN MARY. Programme number: LDC5951H. Date: 26/09/1967. Catalogue number: 9420702.
QUEEN MARY: LAST VOYAGE ENDS AT SOUTHAMPTON. Programme number: ANB6251B. Date: 27/09/1967. Catalogue number: 473735.
QUEEN MARY LINER FINAL HOMECOMING TO SOUTHAMPTON. Programme number: ANB6251B. Date: 27/09/1967. Catalogue number: 473725.
TUESDAY DOCUMENTARY: SHIPS OF STATE. Programme number: LGF6506K. Date: 09/09/1975. Catalogue number: 1174602.
THE GREAT LINERS: 3. Programme number: NBSA750N. Date: 29/10/1979. Catalogue number: 1160034.
BBC SOUTH TODAY. Programme number: B:RSRW042L. Date: 17/10/1983. Catalogue number: 11950.
THE VISIT: THE GOLDEN VOYAGE. Programme number: NGWJ001K. Date: 26/11/1986. Catalogue number: 124891.
BBC SOUTH TODAY. Programme number: D:RSRW750A. Date: 14/12/1988. Catalogue number: 269219.
BBC SOUTH TODAY. Programme number: E:RSRW243J. Date: 26/09/1991. Catalogue number: 366162.

External links
 for detailed service records of British WWII officers, including a larger selection of portraits
 for summary WWII service record
 for detailed service records of British/Allied WWII warships
 HMS Firedrake website
 HMS Sunflower crewmember's website
 convoy escort movements for River-class frigates
 list of Captains of RMS Queen Mary
 very rare film documenting the final Westbound transatlantic crossing of RMS Queen Mary in 1967
 last Captain of RMS Caronia, 1968
 Queen Mother visits liner RMS Queen Elizabeth before last voyage, 1968
 Chris' Cunard Page

1905 births
1993 deaths
Royal Navy officers
Royal Navy officers of World War II
British Merchant Navy officers
Welsh sailors
Ship captains of the Cunard Line
Steamship captains
Royal Naval Reserve personnel